Nava Kerala Mission is an initiative of the Pinarayi Vijayan-led Government of Kerala launched in November 2016. The initiative seeks to address problems faced in  four key social sectors, namely, health, education, agriculture and housing, with the help and involvement of local self-governments. The Mission was officially launched by P. Sathasivam, Governor of Kerala, in a meeting held in Thiruvananthapuram on 10 November 2016.

Schemes under the Mission
The mission emphasizes the implementation four schemes:

Haritha Keralam 
This envisages a clean state by taking up various waste management programmes. It is also planned to implement sanitation schemes, projects for preserving water sources, agriculture development and promotion of organic farming.

Aardram
This scheme is aimed at  improving facilities in government run hospitals with a view to extend treatment at a reasonable cost.

Life
Under this scheme, it is proposed to provide housing for all homeless people. The declared aim of the scheme to build houses for an estimated 4.32 lakh families in Kerala who don't own any land or houses. It has been estimated that an amount of Rs.6,000-6,500 crore (Rs.  – Rs. ) may be required to fully implement the scheme. People who stay in non liveable houses were also included in this project.

Comprehensive Educational Rejuvenation Programme
This is a scheme to preserve and strengthen the public education system of Kerala. One of the key proposals under the scheme is develop about a 1000 schools to international standards.

References

External links
http://missions.kerala.gov.in/
http://haritham.kerala.gov.in
http://lifemission.lsgkerala.gov.in

Local government in Kerala
Economic planning in India
2016 establishments in Kerala
History of Kerala (1947–present)